In music theory, an augmented sixth chord contains the interval of an augmented sixth, usually above its bass tone. This chord has its origins in the Renaissance, was further developed in the Baroque, and became a distinctive part of the musical style of the Classical and Romantic periods.

Conventionally used with a predominant function (resolving to the dominant), the three most common types of augmented sixth chords are usually called the Italian sixth, the French sixth, and the German sixth.

Augmented sixth interval

The augmented sixth interval is typically between the sixth degree of the minor scale, and the raised fourth degree, . With standard voice leading, the chord is followed directly or indirectly by some form of the dominant chord, in which both  and  have resolved to the fifth scale degree, .

Although augmented sixth chords are more common in the minor mode, they are also used in the major mode by borrowing  of the parallel minor scale.

Types
There are three main types of augmented sixth chords, commonly known as the Italian sixth, the French sixth, and the German sixth. 

Though each is named after a European nationality, theorists disagree on their precise origins and have struggled for centuries to define their roots, and fit them into conventional harmonic theory. According to Kostka and Payne, the other two terms are similar to the Italian sixth, which, "has no historical authenticity-[being] simply a convenient and traditional label."

Italian sixth

The Italian sixth (It+6 or It6 or iv6) is derived from iv6 with an altered fourth scale degree, . This is the only augmented sixth chord comprising just three distinct notes; in four-part writing, the tonic pitch is doubled.

The Italian sixth is enharmonically equivalent to an incomplete dominant seventh. VI7=V7: A, C, (E,) G.

French sixth

The French sixth (Fr+6 or Fr) is similar to the Italian, but with an additional tone, . The notes of the French sixth chord are all contained within the same whole tone scale, lending a sonority common to French music in the 19th century (especially associated with Impressionist music).

This chord has the same notes as a dominant seventh flat five chord and is in fact the second inversion of II75.

German sixth
The German sixth (Ger+6 or Ger) is also like the Italian, but with an added tone, .

In Classical music, however, it appears in much the same places as the other variants, though perhaps less often because of the contrapuntal difficulties outlined below. It appears frequently in the works of Beethoven, and in ragtime music. The German sixth chord is enharmonically equivalent to a dominant seventh chord though it functions differently.

Avoiding parallel fifths 
It is more difficult to avoid parallel fifths when resolving a German sixth chord to the dominant chord. These parallel fifths, referred to as Mozart fifths, were occasionally accepted by common practice composers. There are two ways they can be avoided:

Other types
Other variants of augmented sixth chords can be found in the repertoire, and are sometimes given whimsical geographical names. For example: 4–6–7–2; (F–A–B–D) is called by one source an Australian sixth, and 7–1–3–5 (B–C–E–G#), sometimes called the Japanese sixth Such anomalies usually have alternative interpretations.

Function

Standard function
From the Baroque to the Romantic periods, augmented sixth chords had the same harmonic function: as a chromatically altered predominant chord (typically, an alteration of ii, IV,  vi7 or their parallel equivalents in the minor mode) leading to a dominant chord.

In most occasions, the augmented-sixth chords precede either the dominant, or the tonic in second inversion. The augmented sixths can be treated as chromatically altered passing chords.

Other functions

In the late Romantic period and other musical traditions, especially jazz, other harmonic possibilities of augmented sixth variants and sonorities outside its function as a predominant were explored, exploiting their particular properties. An example of this is through the "reinterpretation" of the harmonic function of a chord: since a chord could simultaneously have more than one enharmonic spelling with different functions (i.e., both predominant as a German sixth and dominant as a dominant seventh), its function could be reinterpreted mid-phrase. This heightens both chromaticism by making possible the tonicization of remotely related keys, and possible dissonances with the juxtaposition of remotely related keys.

Tchaikovsky considered the augmented sixth chords to be altered dominant chords. He described the augmented sixth chords to be inversions of the diminished triad and of dominant and diminished seventh chords with a lowered second degree, and accordingly resolving into the tonic. He notes that, "some theorists insist upon [augmented sixth chord's] resolution not into the tonic but into the dominant triad, and regard them as being erected not on the altered 2nd degree, but on the altered 6th degree in major and on the natural 6th degree in minor", yet calls this view, "fallacious", insisting that a, "chord of the augmented sixth on the 6th degree is nothing else than a modulatory degression into the key of the dominant".

The example below shows the last nine measures from Schubert's Piano Sonata in A major, D. 959. In m. 352, an Italian sixth chord built on scale degree  functions as a substitute for the dominant.

Inversions
Augmented sixth chords are occasionally used with a different chord member in the bass. Since there is no consensus among theorists that they are in root position in their normal form, the word "inversion" isn't necessarily accurate, but is found in some textbooks, nonetheless. Sometimes, "inverted" augmented sixth chords occur as a product of voice leading.

Rousseau considered that the chord could not be inverted. Seventeenth century instances of the augmented sixth with the sharp note in the bass are generally limited to German sources. 

The excerpt below is from J.S. Bach's Mass in B minor. At the end of the second measure, the augmented sixth is inverted to create a diminished third or tenth between the bass and the soprano (C–E); these two voices resolve inward to an octave.

Related chords 
In music theory, the double-diminished triad is an archaic concept and term referring to a triad, or three note chord, which, already being minor, has its root raised a semitone, making it "doubly diminished". However, this may be used as the derivation of the augmented sixth chord. For example, F–A–C is a minor triad, so F–A–C is a doubly diminished triad. This is enharmonically equivalent to G–A–C, an incomplete dominant seventh A, missing its fifth), which is a tritone substitute that resolves to G. Its inversion, A–C–F, is the Italian sixth chord that resolves to G.

Classical harmonic theory would notate the tritone substitute as an augmented sixth chord on 2. The augmented sixth chord can either be (i) an It+6 enharmonically equivalent to a dominant seventh chord (with a missing fifth); (ii) a Ger+6 equivalent to a dominant seventh chord with (with a fifth); or (iii) a Fr+6 equivalent to the Lydian dominant (with a missing fifth), all of which serve in a classical context as a substitute for the secondary dominant of V.

All variants of augmented sixth chords are closely related to the applied dominant V7 of II. Both Italian and German variants are enharmonically identical to dominant seventh chords. For example, in the key of C, the German sixth chord could be reinterpreted as the applied dominant of D.

Simon Sechter explains the chord of the French sixth chord as being a chromatically altered version of a seventh chord on the second degree of the scale, . The German sixth is explained as a chromatically altered ninth chord on the same root but with the root omitted.

The tendency of the interval of the augmented sixth to resolve outwards is therefore explained by the fact that the A, being a dissonant note, a diminished fifth above the root (D), and flatted, must fall, whilst the F – being chromatically raised – must rise.

Relationship between the different types
The following "curious chromatic sequence", graphed by Dmitri Tymoczko as a four-dimensional tesseract, outlines the relationships between the augmented sixth chords in 12TET tuning:

 Starting with a diminished seventh chord, lower any factor by a semitone.  The result is equivalently to a German sixth chord.
 From the German sixth chord, lower any factor by a semitone so that the result is ancohemitonic (i.e.: possesses no half steps). The result is a French sixth chord or minor seventh chord possibly posing as a virtual augmented sixth.
 From the French sixth chord (or minor seventh chord posing as augmented sixth), there exists a factor which, when lowered by semitone, gives a result equivalent to a half-diminished seventh chord possibly posing as a virtual augmented sixth.
 From the half-diminished seventh chord as augmented sixth, there exists a factor which, when lowered by a semitone, is equivalent to a diminished seventh chord at the interval one semitone lower than the diminished seventh chord which started the sequence.
 Three repetitions of the above complete the cycle in modulo-12 note space, forming a necklace of three tesseracts joined at opposite corners by diminished seventh chords and subsuming all 12 notes of the chromatic scale.

Minor seventh as virtual augmented sixth chord
The minor seventh chord may also have its interval of minor seventh (between the root and seventh degree (i.e.: C–B in C–E–G–B) rewritten as an augmented sixth (C–E–G–A). Rearranging and transposing, this gives A–C–E–F, a virtual minor version of the German sixth chord. Again like the typical +6, this enharmonic interpretation gives a resolution irregular for the minor seventh but normal for the augmented sixth, where the two voices at the enharmonic major second converge to a unison or diverge to an octave.

Half-diminished seventh as virtual augmented sixth chord
The half-diminished seventh chord is the inversion of the German sixth chord (it is its inversion as a set, rather than as a chord). Its interval of minor seventh (between root and seventh degree (i.e.: C–B in C–E–G–B) can be written as an augmented sixth (C–E–G–A).  Rearranging and transposing, this gives A–C–D–F, a virtual minor version of the French sixth chord.  Like the typical +6, this enharmonic interpretation gives a resolution irregular for the half-diminished seventh but normal for the augmented sixth, where the two voices at the enharmonic major second converge to a unison or diverge to an octave.

Tristan chord

Richard Wagner's Tristan chord, the first vertical sonority in his opera, Tristan und Isolde, can be interpreted as a half-diminished seventh that transitions to a French sixth in the key of A minor (F–A–B–D, in red below). The upper voice continues upward with a long appoggiatura (G to A). Note that the D resolves down to D instead of up to E:

See also
Acoustic scale

Notes

References

Further reading

External links

 Augmented sixths in Commons.

Chords
Chromaticism